Hypleurochilus pseudoaequipinnis is a species of combtooth blenny found in the Atlantic ocean, in the Americas it ranges from Cape Canaveral, Florida to Santa Catarina in Brazil and the eastern Atlantic it is found off Sao Tome and Principe in the Gulf of Guinea.

References

pseudoaequipinnis
Fish of the Western Atlantic
Taxa named by Hans Bath
Fish described in 1994